Longichela orobica is an extinct species of prawn which lived in the Norian, and is the only species in the genus Longichela.

Distribution
Fossils of this species were found only in the Triassic marine strata of Lombardy (Northern Italy).

References

 Paleobiology Dayabase

Penaeidae
Triassic crustaceans
Monotypic arthropod genera
Fossils of Italy